Steve Clouse (born February 7, 1956) is an American politician. He is a member of the Alabama House of Representatives from the 93rd District, serving since 1994. He is a member of the Republican party.

References

Living people
Republican Party members of the Alabama House of Representatives
1956 births
21st-century American politicians